Gwendolynne Sophia Moore (born April 18, 1951) is an American politician serving as the U.S. representative for  since 2005. In 2016, Moore was elected to serve as caucus whip of the Congressional Black Caucus for the 115th United States Congress. She is a member of the Democratic Party. Her district is based in Milwaukee and as a result of the 2011 redistricting also includes some Milwaukee County suburbs: Bayside, Brown Deer, Cudahy, Fox Point, Glendale, St. Francis, South Milwaukee, West Milwaukee, Shorewood and Whitefish Bay. Moore is the first woman to represent the district and the second woman after Tammy Baldwin and the first African American elected to Congress from Wisconsin.

Moore became the dean of Wisconsin's congressional delegation in 2023, after Representative Ron Kind retired.

Early life, education and career
Moore was born in Racine, but has spent most of her life in Milwaukee. She is the eighth of nine children; her father was a factory worker and her mother a public school teacher. Moore attended North Division High School and served as student council president. She later attended Marquette University and became a single mother and welfare recipient. She earned a Bachelor of Arts degree in political science in 1973.

As an organizer with AmeriCorps VISTA, Moore worked to establish the Cream City Community Development Credit Union to offer grants and loans to low-income residents to start businesses. For her work, she was awarded the national "VISTA Volunteer of the Decade" award from 1976 to 1986. From 1985 to 1989, she worked for the City of Milwaukee as a neighborhood development strategist and for the state Department of Employment Relations and Health and Social Services. Moore also worked for the Wisconsin Housing and Economic Development Authority (WHEDA) as a housing officer.

Wisconsin legislature
Moore was elected to the Wisconsin Assembly in 1988 and served two terms representing the 7th district. She was a prominent voice calling for an investigation into the case of serial killer Jeffrey Dahmer, who lived two blocks from Moore.

In 1992, Moore was elected to the Wisconsin State Senate, in which she represented the 4th district from 1993 to 2005. She was the first African-American woman to be elected to the state senate and became a prominent voice against mandatory ID security measures to enter the Capitol. She said, "I am too often reminded [9/11 hijacker] Mohammed Atta had a photo ID. This will not tell people whether I am a terrorist. This disenfranchises people who come to their Capitol."

U.S. House of Representatives

Moore was elected to the United States House of Representatives in 2004 with 69.6% of the vote, defeating Republican attorney Gerald Boyle. She was one of a handful of African Americans to be elected to Congress as freshmen in 2004, and the first African American and second woman (after Tammy Baldwin) to represent Wisconsin in Congress.

Moore is a prominent advocate for women's rights, releasing frequent statements on topics ranging from domestic abuse awareness to abortion rights. In January 2011, she was elected Democratic co-chair of the Congressional Women's Caucus to become a leader on health insurance reform and the protection of reproductive rights. She is a member of the Congressional Progressive Caucus.

During the congressional debate in February 2011 on the Pence Amendment to defund Planned Parenthood, in response to comments from Paul Broun suggesting that Planned Parenthood promoted racist eugenics because more black women than white women have abortions, Moore spoke about her experience raising children on little money, and why "planned parenthood is healthy for women, it's healthy for children and it's healthy for our society". She publicly opposed the investigation into Planned Parenthood's financial accounting, saying the investigation was "an unfortunate waste of taxpayer dollars". Moore voted "nay" on Amends Patient Protection and Affordable Care Act to Prohibit Abortion Coverage on October 13, 2011. In March 2012, during the House debate over reauthorizing the Violence Against Women Act, she spoke about her experience of being sexually assaulted and raped as a child and an adult, criticizing the all-male Senate Judiciary Committee that voted "no" on the bill.

In the first session of the 109th Congress, Moore earned 90% and higher legislative agenda approval scores from Planned Parenthood of Wisconsin, the National Association for the Advancement of Colored People, the Sierra Club of Wisconsin, and the Service Employees International Union. She has focused legislatively on traditional Democratic and progressive issues, believing that the federal government should play a significant role in the amelioration of poverty and the resolution of difficult local problems. Moore has received support from interest groups including the American Civil Liberties Union (93%), The Human Rights Campaign (100%), The National Abortion and Reproductive Rights Action League (NARAL) (100%), The National Farmer's Union (100%) and Defenders of Wildlife Action Fund (100%). She lacks support from those supporting hunting and sportsmen rights (0% support from Sportsmen and Animal Owner's Voting Alliance), opponents of abortion rights (0% support from National Right to Life), and conservative tax reform stances (0% support from Americans for Tax Reform).

During her first term, Moore introduced legislation to provide economic incentives and tax cuts to small businesses to promote job creation, and also cosponsored legislation supporting community block grants, continuing and expanding Medicaid funding, amending the Truth in Lending Act to prevent so-called "predatory lending", and removing troops from Iraq. She also cosponsored two prospective amendments to the US Constitution, providing for uniform national election standards and prohibiting gender discrimination.

On May 6, 2006, Moore and eight fellow members of the Congressional Black Caucus were arrested and ticketed for unlawful assembly and disorderly conduct after they stepped onto the grounds of the Embassy of Sudan to call attention to the ongoing Darfur conflict. Moore said the group expected to be arrested but that they were pleased to participate in a "peaceful act of civil disobedience".

In July 2019, Moore voted against a House resolution introduced by Representative Brad Schneider opposing efforts to boycott the State of Israel and the Global Boycott, Divestment, and Sanctions Movement targeting Israel. The resolution passed 398-17.

On December 18, 2019, Moore voted for both articles of impeachment against President Donald Trump.

In 2023, Moore was among 56 Democrats to vote in favor of H.Con.Res. 21 which directed President Joe Biden to remove U.S. troops from Syria within 180 days.

Committee assignments
Committee on Ways and Means 
Subcommittee on Oversight
Subcommittee on Select Revenue Measures
Subcommittee on Worker and Family Support

Caucus memberships
Congressional Progressive Caucus

Personal life
Moore's son, Supreme Moore Omokunde (then known as Sowande Ajumoke Omokunde), was arrested in connection with the November 2, 2004, tire-slashing of Republican Party vehicles in Milwaukee. He was charged on January 24, 2005, with a felony in connection with the event, but agreed on January 20, 2006, to plead no contest in exchange for a sentencing recommendation of restitution and probation. On April 26, 2006, Milwaukee County Circuit Judge Michael B. Brennan disregarded the sentencing recommendation and sentenced Omokunde to four months in prison and $2,305 in fines and restitution. In response, Moore said, "I love my son very much. I'm very proud of him. He's accepted responsibility."

Omokunde went on to become a member of the Milwaukee County Board of Supervisors in 2015, and was elected to the Wisconsin State Assembly in 2020.

Moore has become a U.S. delegate to the Parliamentary Assembly of the Organization for Security and Co-operation in Europe.

Moore attended the 2016 Democratic National Convention as a superdelegate, pledging her support to nominee Hillary Clinton.

Moore spoke at the 2020 Democratic National Convention, which was centered in Milwaukee.

On December 28, 2020, Moore announced that she had tested positive for COVID-19 and was self-isolating from others. She traveled to Washington to vote for Nancy Pelosi as Speaker of the House after announcing that her quarantine period had ended.

Moore is a Baptist.

Electoral history

Wisconsin Assembly (1988, 1990)

Wisconsin Senate (1992, 1996, 2000)

U.S. House (2004–present)

See also
 List of African-American United States representatives
 Women in the United States House of Representatives

References

External links

Gwen Moore official U.S. House website
Gwen Moore for Congress official campaign website

|-

|-

1951 births
21st-century American politicians
21st-century American women politicians
African-American members of the United States House of Representatives
African-American state legislators in Wisconsin
African-American women in politics
Baptists from Wisconsin
Baptists from the United States
Democratic Party members of the United States House of Representatives from Wisconsin
Female members of the United States House of Representatives
Marquette University alumni
Democratic Party members of the Wisconsin State Assembly
Living people
Politicians from Milwaukee
Politicians from Racine, Wisconsin
Democratic Party Wisconsin state senators
Women state legislators in Wisconsin
North Division High School (Milwaukee) alumni
21st-century African-American women
21st-century African-American politicians
20th-century African-American people
20th-century African-American women